Toine Manders (born 17 August 1969 in Deurne) is a Dutch lawyer and leader of the Libertarian Party.

He was director of the Haags Juristen College (HJC), translated as "Hague Lawyers Board", which was founded in 1984 and until 1996 helped some 6,000 tax payers to avoid taxes.

On 1 July 2010, the District Court in The Hague, declared the bankruptcy of the HJC as a result of a claim by the tax authorities. After the bankruptcy declaration the trustee who was entrusted with the settlement of the bankruptcy did a legal complaint against Toine Manders for embezzlement and bankruptcy fraud.

References

1969 births
Living people
People from Deurne, Netherlands
Dutch libertarians
Dutch politicians